Robert George Renner, Sr. (April 2, 1923 – March 1, 2005) was a United States district judge of the United States District Court for the District of Minnesota.

Education and career
Renner was born in Nevis, Minnesota. He served in the United States Army during World War II from March 1943 to January 1946 and became a corporal. He received a Bachelor of Arts degree from Saint John's University in Minnesota in 1947 and a Juris Doctor from Georgetown Law in 1949. He was in private practice in Walker, Minnesota from 1949 to 1969. He was a Minnesota state representative from 1957 to 1969. He was the United States Attorney for the District of Minnesota from 1969 to 1977.

Federal judicial service

In 1977 Renner was appointed as a United States Magistrate for the United States District Court for the District of Minnesota and served in that role until 1980. He was nominated by President Jimmy Carter on November 30, 1979, to the United States District Court for the District of Minnesota, to a new seat created by 92 Stat. 1629. He was confirmed by the United States Senate on February 20, 1980, and received his commission the same day. He assumed senior status on February 22, 1992. Renner served in that capacity until his death of a heart attack on March 1, 2005, in Roseville, Minnesota.

References

1923 births
2005 deaths
College of Saint Benedict and Saint John's University alumni
Georgetown University Law Center alumni
Judges of the United States District Court for the District of Minnesota
Members of the Minnesota House of Representatives
United States district court judges appointed by Jimmy Carter
20th-century American judges
United States Army non-commissioned officers
United States magistrate judges
United States Attorneys for the District of Minnesota
People from Hubbard County, Minnesota
People from Walker, Minnesota
United States Army personnel of World War II